The Friedländer synthesis is a chemical reaction of 2-aminobenzaldehydes with ketones to form quinoline derivatives. It is named after German chemist Paul Friedländer (1857–1923).

This reaction has been catalyzed by trifluoroacetic acid, toluenesulfonic acid, iodine, and Lewis acids.

Several reviews have been published.

Mechanism
Two viable reaction mechanisms exist for this reaction. In the first mechanism 2-amino substituted carbonyl compound 1 and carbonyl compound 2 react in a rate-limiting step to aldol adduct 3. This intermediate loses water in an elimination reaction to unsaturated carbonyl compound 4 and then loses water again in imine formation to quinoline 7. In the second mechanism the first step is Schiff base formation to 5 followed by Aldol reaction to 6 and elimination to 7.

The Pfitzinger reaction and the Niementowski quinoline synthesis are variations of the Friedländer reaction.

See also
Doebner-Miller reaction
Povarov reaction
Skraup reaction

References

Condensation reactions
Quinoline forming reactions
Name reactions